Zion Lights (born June 1984) is a British author and activist known for her environmental work and science communication.

She was a spokesperson for Extinction Rebellion (XR) UK on TV and radio between 2018 and 2020, and founded and edited XR's Hourglass newspaper. She wrote a column for The Huffington Post, authored the evidence-based nonfiction book The Ultimate Guide to Green Parenting, and contributed to Zero Waste Kids with humanitarian Rob Greenfield Rob Greenfield. She has given a TED talk on the need for people to be able to stargaze.

Early life
Lights was born in the West Midlands. Her parents immigrated to the UK from a small village in the Punjab in India and were factory workers in Birmingham. When she was young, Lights made an appearance on Junior Mastermind. Her first poem was published in an anthology when she was 12.
 
Lights attended the University of Reading, graduating in 2005 with a degree in English Language and Literature. She completed an MSc in Science Communication at the University of the West of England in 2019.

Career
Lights is an environmental activist and writer with a focus on ethical parenting and climate change.

She joined the Camp for Climate Action movement in 2006, where she was arrested multiple times for protesting coal and tar sands investment, and witnessed police brutality at the Kingsnorth camp.

She appeared on Good Morning Britain multiple times to talk about climate change, once resulting in criticism from viewers who complained that host Richard Madeley barely allowed Lights to speak.

She has written one nonfiction book titled The Ultimate Guide to Green Parenting (2015). and contributed to another, Zero Waste Kids, co-authored with Rob Greenfield. In 2018 she released her first poetry collection, Only a Moment. Lights' poetry has appeared in the Tolpuddle Special of Citizen 32 magazine, in Musings, a poetry collection collated to raise funds for La Leche League GB, and most recently in the collection A Nightingale Sang, a limited poetry magazine created for New Networks for Nature.

Lights is an outspoken science advocate: in 2015 the Western Morning News newspaper reported that she is against pseudoscience. In 2018 she gave a TEDx talk on astronomy, entitled "Don't forget to look up", at the University of Bristol. In August 2015, Lights was dubbed 'Britain's greenest mother' by The Daily Telegraph newspaper. In September 2015 Lucy Siegle, writing in The Observer, described Lights as "an eco pragmatist, happily heavy on evidence. She has no truck with hippy myths – she does believe you should vaccinate your child."

She was a columnist for the Express & Echo newspaper for six months in 2014. She was co-editor of Juno magazine for 7 years and wrote for The Huffington Post. Lights left Juno in 2019 to work for Extinction Rebellion where she was part of XR UK’s Media & Messaging team.

She founded and edited the XR newspaper The Hourglass, which launched in September 2019 and ran until May 2020. As spokesperson for Extinction Rebellion Lights spoke and wrote frequently in the media to defend civil disobedience as a tactic for action on climate change.

She featured in the documentary NOW. by German filmmaker Jim Rakete and the Al Jazeera documentary What Is Climate Change?

She appeared on the BBC multiple times to discuss the power of protest and need for climate action, and was interviewed on Ed Miliband's podcast Reasons to be Cheerful.

She left XR after an interview on The Andrew Neil Show in October 2019 where she was unable to defend the claim a co-founder of Extinction Rebellion had made that 6 billion people would die by the end of the century due to climate change. The interview went viral and received widespread media coverage and criticism. Soon after the interview Lights went public about the claim, telling the BBC that: "It's a headline-grabbing assertion - but unfortunately, it's also not true, or certainly not backed up by any evidence. As was obvious to anyone who knows me - and even to the casual viewer - I was plunged into a PR nightmare. I could not defend the number, but as the official spokesperson nor could I be seen to condemn it. All I could do, instead, was flounder under the hot glare of the studio lights for what felt like an eternity.".

In response, Extinction Rebellion defended the claim and called on the media to de-platform Lights.

Zion has given lectures at many universities, The Royal Institution, and REF in Paris alongside French ministers where she called on the French government to be ambitious with their nuclear energy ambitions.

Her talks focus on the importance of communicating science effectively, the climate and ecological emergency, the problems with environmentalism, clean energy, her experiences of being a woman of colour in the green movement.

Politics

Lights has been a Labour City Councillor for the Pennsylvania ward in Exeter since May 2021. She was previously a Green Party member, but quit citing disagreements over nuclear energy: “There were two Green Party members on stage with a scientist from the UK Met Office.” They talked for a long time about renewables but never mentioned nuclear, “So I asked the question to the scientist: ‘The research I’m reading says we need nuclear alongside renewables’. But the host of the event didn’t allow him to answer on the mic. The other panellists just said, ‘we don’t need nuclear’ and everyone cheered! I quit the Green Party on the same day.”

Nuclear energy

Soon after leaving XR, Lights became a Director of the UK branch of Environmental Progress, an organisation founded and directed by Michael Shellenberger to advocate for nuclear energy.  Zion originally contacted Michael to complain about an article he had written for Forbes in which she was pictured alongside Greta Thunberg, US Congresswoman Alexandria Ocasio-Cortez, Bill McKibben and a koala bear under the title 'Why Apocalyptic Claims About Climate Change Are Wrong'

During a heated conversation, Shellenberger brought up environmentalist opposition to nuclear energy, and Lights told him that she had changed her mind and was now in favour of nuclear energy. She was offered a job advocating for it, and wrote that "It is time to focus on solutions. It’s crucial that environmental activists tell the truth about nuclear power, instead of giving into peer pressure and fear."

After 5 months at Environmental Progress, Lights left to set up her own climate activist group, Emergency Reactor, which she founded alongside philanthropist Daniel Aegerter, Robert Stone, and Joel Scott-Halkes. She has now become one of the most sought-after speakers in the world on nuclear energy, writing for newspapers around the world including German newspaper Die Welt, and appearing in French press and media including l'Express, la Tribune, France 24, Atlantico, le Point, Marianne, and l'Opinion. She has compared being anti-nuclear to being anti-vaccination and told French press that "every nuclear power plant closure is a crime against humanity".

Emergency Reactor has undertaken several protests in London and Bristol in the UK, including staging a wedding between nuclear and renewables at COP26. Zion has featured in the Australian documentary The Clean Energy Debate in 2021 and written numerous articles to address the myths around nuclear energy, stating in OpenDemocracy that she is frequently attacked for doing so. She authored a paper for Knowmad Insitut on the Sustainable Development Goals (SDGs), which include fossil fuels but not nuclear energy.

Personal life
Lights is a single mother and lives in Devon with her two daughters.

Publications
More Things Should Be Thought Out Thus: A Story of Many Stories, and Many Stories About One Story. Self-published, 2010. .
The Ultimate Guide to Green Parenting. New Internationalist, 2015. .
Only a Moment. Self-published, 2018. .

References

1984 births
Living people
Alumni of the University of Reading
British magazine editors
Sustainability advocates
Green thinkers
British women poets
Climate activists
Women magazine editors
Extinction Rebellion
Sentientists